Dennis Mark Nagy (born May 22, 1943) was acting Director of the Defense Intelligence Agency from September 1991 to November 1991.

Background
Nagy, who is of Hungarian ancestry, attended the United States Air Force Academy and graduated in 1965 with a bachelor of science degree in international relations and a commission in the U.S. Air Force as 2nd Lt. He served as a pilot in the Air Force from 1965 to 1966, then attended graduate school at Georgetown University in International Relations. He began at the Defense Intelligence Agency in July 1969 as an intelligence analyst.

First Assignment
His first permanent assignment was in 1970 with the newly formed Directorate of Estimates (DE). During
a succession of progressively responsible assignments in DE, Nagy focused on Soviet strategic nuclear and space forces and on policy and doctrinal issues; he was the principal drafter of numerous departmental and national estimates. His service with DE culminated in being selected twice by the Director of Central Intelligence’s National Intelligence Officer for Strategic Programs as manager of the annual National Intelligence Estimate for Soviet Strategic Nuclear Forces. In late 1980, Nagy became a DIA executive and was selected to be the first deputy vice director for overall management of program development for estimative, basic, and scientific and technical intelligence production. During several extended periods, Nagy served as the acting vice director.

Soviet Military Power
In 1981, Nagy personally directed the development of
the first issue of Soviet Military Power, DoD’s annual
publication on Soviet military policies and forces. In
September 1982, Nagy became a charter member of the
Defense Intelligence Senior Executive Service. In 1985,
Nagy was appointed to the position of Assistant Deputy
Director for Research. In this capacity, he held the position
of chief of the Directorate for Research (DB), DIA’s
largest single military intelligence production organization.
He also served as the General Defense Intelligence
Program (GDIP) functional manager for general
military intelligence and as the chairman of the Council
of Defense Intelligence Producers and the Military
Targeting Committee. From there, Nagy was appointed
to the position of executive director, DIA, elevating him
to the Agency’s command element and ranking him as
the Agency’s senior civilian. Nagy was appointed deputy
director and became acting director in September 1991.

Director
Nagy was appointed acting director for the interim period from September through November 1991, the first civilian ever placed in that position. As acting director, he provided continuity during a critical time when decrements against Agency resources caused reconsideration of many managerial issues and review of traditional threat priorities throughout the Defense Intelligence Community. He served until Lieutenant General James R. Clapper, Jr., USAF, assumed the directorship.

References

Directors of the Defense Intelligence Agency
Living people
1943 births
American people of Hungarian descent